Radical 179 or radical leek meaning "leek" is one of the 11 Kangxi radicals (214 radicals in total) composed of 9 strokes.

In the Kangxi Dictionary, there are 20 characters (out of 49,030) to be found under this radical.

 is also the 181st indexing component in the Table of Indexing Chinese Character Components predominantly adopted by Simplified Chinese dictionaries published in mainland China.

Evolution

Derived characters

References

Literature 

179
181